Norales is a Hispanic surname. Notable people with the surname include:

Erick Norales (born 1985), Honduran football player
Prudencio Norales (born 1956), Honduran football player
Roby Norales (born 1991), Honduran football player

See also
Morales

Spanish-language surnames